Long Gulch is a valley in San Mateo County, California.

References

See also
List of watercourses in the San Francisco Bay Area

Valleys of San Mateo County, California
Landforms of the San Francisco Bay Area
Valleys of California